Arioli is a surname. Notable people with the surname include:

 Giovanni Arioli (born 1976), Italian footballer 
 Susie Arioli (born 1963), Canadian jazz singer

See also
 Ariotti